The Singles is a 2008 compilation album by Hall & Oates. It reached No. 29 in the UK Albums Chart, remaining on the chart for three weeks in June 2008.

Track listing
"Maneater"
"I Can't Go for That (No Can Do)"
"She's Gone"
"Family Man"
"Out of Touch"
"Method of Modern Love"
"Private Eyes"
"Sara Smile"
"Wait for Me"
"You've Lost That Lovin' Feeling"
"Kiss on My List"
"You Make My Dreams"
"One On One"
"Say It Isn't So"
"Adult Education"
"Some Things Are Better Left Unsaid"
"Everything Your Heart Desires"
"Rich Girl"

Certifications

References 

2008 greatest hits albums
Hall & Oates compilation albums